Rotorboides is a genus of recent (Holocene) bottom dwelling (benthic) forams from the Atlantic, Pacific  and Indian Oceans, related to Rosalina.

The test is trochospiral and planoconvex, with a  broadly rounded periphery and  about six to nine chambers in the final whorl.  Sutures on the spiral side are crescentic and strongly oblique.  Chambers on the umbilical side  are subtriangular, each with a triangular folium, or flap,  that extends into the umbilical area, folia of successive chambers fuse to form an umbilical plate that is solid or has only rare perforations. Sutures on the umbilical  side are radial and deeply incised.  The test wall is calcareous, coarsely perforate on the spiral side, but imperforate adjacent to the sutures. The umbilical side is imperforate and smooth. The aperture  is an interiomarginal arch, outside the umbilicus, extending nearly to the periphery.

References 

 Alfred R. Loeblich Jr and Helen Tappan, 1988. Forminiferal Genera and their classification. Geological Survey of Iran, (e-book) 2005. 

Rosalinidae
Rotaliida genera